Josef Geryk (14 October 1942 – 27 July 2013) was Czech football goalkeeper who played for FC Spartak Trnava during the 1960s and 1970s. He won the Czechoslovakian championship five times with Spartak from 1968 through 1973.

References

1942 births
2013 deaths
Czechoslovak footballers
Association football goalkeepers
FC Spartak Trnava players